Gladys Doyle is a former Papua New Guinea international lawn bowler.

Bowls career
In 1969 she won the singles gold medal and the triples bronze medal at the 1969 World Outdoor Bowls Championship in Sydney, Australia. Doyle won another bronze four years later during the 1973 World Outdoor Bowls Championship. She also won a bronze medal in the team event (Taylor Trophy) in 1969. 

From 1955-1963 she was the South Townsville Bowling Club champion.

References

Living people
Papua New Guinean female bowls players
Bowls World Champions
Year of birth missing (living people)